Hugo B. Margáin Gleason ( – ) was a Mexican economist, politician and diplomat who served as Secretary of Finance in the cabinet of Luis Echeverría (1970–73), as ambassador of Mexico to the United States (1964–70 and 1976–82), as ambassador of Mexico to the United Kingdom (1973–76) and as senator representing the Institutional Revolutionary Party (PRI, 1982–88).

References

Ambassadors of Mexico to the United States
Mexican Secretaries of Finance
Members of the Senate of the Republic (Mexico)
National Autonomous University of Mexico alumni
Academic staff of the National Autonomous University of Mexico
Academic staff of El Colegio de México
1913 births
1997 deaths
20th-century Mexican  economists